Eugenia pachychlamys is a species of plant in the family Myrtaceae. It is found in El Salvador and Guatemala. It is threatened by habitat loss.

References

pachychlamys
Data deficient plants
Taxonomy articles created by Polbot